Lídia Mattos (10 October 1924 – 22 January 2013) was a Brazilian actress whose career spanned radio, theater, television and film.

Mattos was born in Rio de Janeiro in 1924. She had four children with her husband, actor Urbano Lóes. She made her film debut in the 1939 Brazilian movie, Aves Sem Ninho, directed by Raul Roulien. She appeared in numerous films throughout the 1940s and 1950s, including Ruy Costa's Pega Ladrão in 1940; Moacyr Fenelon's Gente Honesta in 1944; Mãos Sangrentas, directed by Carlos Hugo Christensen in 1955; and Eurípedes Ramos's O Diamante in 1956. She continued to be cast in film roles during the 1970s and 1980s as well.

In 2000, Mattos was awarded as Best Supporting Actress in the Gramado Film Festival by the role of Letícia in the Florinda Bolkan's film, Eu Não Conhecia Tururu.

Death
Mattos died on 22 January 2013 from pneumonia at the Espanhol Hospital in Rio de Janeiro, where she had been hospitalized since 25 December 2012, at the age of 88. She was buried in the São João Batista cemetery in Botafogo. Mattos was survived by her four children; seven grandchildren and three great-grandchildren.

Filmography

References

External links

1924 births
2013 deaths
Brazilian film actresses
Brazilian television actresses
Brazilian stage actresses
Actresses from Rio de Janeiro (city)